Legionella worsleiensis is a bacterium from the genus Legionella which was isolated from industrial cooling tower in Worsley in England.

References

External links
Type strain of Legionella worsleiensis at BacDive -  the Bacterial Diversity Metadatabase

Legionellales
Bacteria described in 1993